Loreley is a Verbandsgemeinde ("collective municipality") in the Rhein-Lahn-Kreis, in Rhineland-Palatinate, Germany. It was historically part of the Duchy of Nassau, a sovereign state until 1866, and is currently located in the Nassau Nature Park. It is situated on the right bank of the Rhine, adjacent to the Nassau district and approx. 25 km southeast of Koblenz. Its seat is in Sankt Goarshausen. It was named after the Loreley Rock. On 1 July 2012, it merged with the former Verbandsgemeinde Braubach. Initially, the new Verbandsgemeinde was named "Braubach-Loreley", but it was renamed "Loreley" on 1 December 2012.

The Verbandsgemeinde Loreley consists of the following Ortsgemeinden ("local municipalities"):

{|
|
 Auel 
 Bornich 
 Braubach
 Dachsenhausen 
 Dahlheim 
 Dörscheid 
 Filsen 
 Kamp-Bornhofen
 Kaub
 Kestert 
 Lierschied 
|valign=top|
 Lykershausen 
 Nochern
 Osterspai
 Patersberg 
 Prath 
 Reichenberg 
 Reitzenhain 
 Sankt Goarshausen
 Sauerthal 
 Weisel 
 Weyer 
|}

External links
 VG Loreley contact detail

Verbandsgemeinde in Rhineland-Palatinate
Middle Rhine
Rhein-Lahn-Kreis